The history of the lands that became the United States began with the arrival of the first people in the Americas around 15,000 BC. Numerous indigenous cultures formed, and many saw transformations in the 16th century away from more densely populated lifestyles and towards reorganized polities elsewhere. The European colonization of the Americas began in the late 15th century, however most colonies in what would later become the United States were settled after 1600. By the 1760s, the thirteen British colonies contained 2.5 million people and were established along the Atlantic Coast east of the Appalachian Mountains. The Southern Colonies built an agricultural system on slave labor, importing slaves from Africa for this purpose. After defeating France, the British government imposed a series of taxes, including the Stamp Act of 1765, rejecting the colonists' constitutional argument that new taxes needed their approval. Resistance to these taxes, especially the Boston Tea Party in 1773, led to Parliament issuing punitive laws designed to end self-government. Armed conflict began in Massachusetts in 1775.

In 1776, in Philadelphia, the Second Continental Congress declared the independence of the colonies as the "United States". Led by General George Washington, it won the Revolutionary War. The peace treaty of 1783 established the borders of the new sovereign state. The Articles of Confederation established a central government, but it was ineffectual at providing stability as it could not collect taxes and had no executive officer. A convention wrote a new Constitution that was adopted in 1789 and a Bill of Rights was added in 1791 to guarantee inalienable rights. With Washington as the first president and Alexander Hamilton his chief adviser, a strong central government was created. Purchase of the Louisiana Territory from France in 1803 doubled the size of the United States.

Encouraged by the notion of manifest destiny, the United States expanded to the Pacific Coast. While the nation was large in terms of area, its population in 1790 was only four million. Westward expansion was driven by a quest for inexpensive land for yeoman farmers and slave owners. The expansion of slavery was increasingly controversial and fueled political and constitutional battles, which were resolved by compromises. Slavery was abolished in all states north of the Mason–Dixon line by 1804, but states in the south continued the institution, to support the kinds of large scale agriculture that dominated the southern economy. Precipitated by the election of Abraham Lincoln as president in 1860, the Civil War began as the southern states seceded from the Union to form their own pro-slavery country, the Confederate States of America. The defeat of the Confederates in 1865 led to the abolition of slavery. In the Reconstruction era following the war, legal and voting rights were extended to freed male slaves. The national government emerged much stronger, and gained explicit duty to protect individual rights. However, when white southern Democrats regained their political power in the South in 1877, often by paramilitary suppression of voting, they passed Jim Crow laws to maintain white supremacy, as well as new state constitutions that legalized discrimination based on race and prevented most African Americans from participating in public life.

The United States became the world's leading industrial power at the turn of the 20th century, due to an outburst of entrepreneurship and industrialization and the arrival of millions of immigrant workers and farmers. A national railroad network was completed and large-scale mines and factories were established. Mass dissatisfaction with corruption, inefficiency, and traditional politics stimulated the Progressive movement, from the 1890s to the 1920s, leading to reforms, including the federal income tax, direct election of Senators, granting of citizenship to many indigenous people, alcohol prohibition, and women's suffrage. Initially neutral during World War I, the United States declared war on Germany in 1917 and funded the Allied victory the following year. After the prosperous Roaring Twenties, the Wall Street Crash of 1929 marked the onset of the decade-long worldwide Great Depression. President Franklin D. Roosevelt implemented his New Deal programs, including relief for the unemployed, support for farmers, social security, and a minimum wage. The New Deal defined modern American liberalism. Following the Japanese attack on Pearl Harbor, the United States entered World War II and financed the Allied war effort, and helped defeat Nazi Germany and Fascist Italy in the European theater. Its involvement culminated in using newly American invented nuclear weapons on Hiroshima and Nagasaki to defeat Imperial Japan in the Pacific War.

The United States and the Soviet Union emerged as rival superpowers in the aftermath of World War II. During the Cold War, the two countries confronted each other indirectly in the arms race, the Space Race, propaganda campaigns, and proxy wars. In the 1960s, in large part due to the strength of the civil rights movement, another wave of social reforms was enacted which enforced the constitutional rights of voting and freedom of movement to African Americans. The Cold War ended when the Soviet Union was officially dissolved, leaving the United States as the world's sole superpower. Foreign policy after the Cold War has often focused on conflicts in the Middle East, especially after the September 11 attacks. Early in the 21st century, the United States experienced the Great Recession and the COVID-19 pandemic, which had a negative effect on the local economy.

Prehistory

It is not definitively known how or when Native Americans first settled the Americas and the present-day United States. The prevailing theory proposes that people from Eurasia followed game across Beringia, a land bridge that connected Siberia to present-day Alaska during the Ice Age, and then spread southward throughout the Americas. This migration may have begun as early as 30,000 years ago and continued through to about 10,000 years ago, when the land bridge became submerged by the rising sea level caused by the melting glaciers.These early inhabitants, called Paleo-Indians, soon diversified into hundreds of culturally distinct nations and tribes.

This pre-Columbian era incorporates all periods in the history of the Americas before the appearance of European influences on the American continents, spanning from the original settlement in the Upper Paleolithic period to European colonization during the early modern period. While the term technically refers to the era before Christopher Columbus' voyage in 1492, in practice the term usually includes the history of American indigenous cultures until they were conquered or significantly influenced by Europeans, even if this happened decades or centuries after Columbus's initial landing.

Paleo-Indians

By 10,000 BCE, humans were relatively well-established throughout North America. Originally, Paleo-Indians hunted Ice Age megafauna like mammoths, but as they began to go extinct, people turned instead to bison as a food source. As time went on, foraging for berries and seeds became an important alternative to hunting. Paleo-Indians in central Mexico were the first in the Americas to farm, starting to plant corn, beans, and squash around 8,000 BCE. Eventually, the knowledge began to spread northward. By 3,000 BCE, corn was being grown in the valleys of Arizona and New Mexico, followed by primitive irrigation systems and early villages of the Hohokam.

One of the earlier cultures in the present-day United States was the Clovis culture, who are primarily identified by the use of fluted spear points called the Clovis point. From 9,100 to 8,850 BCE, the culture ranged over much of North America and also appeared in South America. Artifacts from this culture were first excavated in 1932 near Clovis, New Mexico. The Folsom culture was similar, but is marked by the use of the Folsom point.

A later migration identified by linguists, anthropologists, and archeologists occurred around 8,000 BCE. This included Na-Dene-speaking peoples, who reached the Pacific Northwest by 5,000 BCE. From there, they migrated along the Pacific Coast and into the interior and constructed large multi-family dwellings in their villages, which were used only seasonally in the summer to hunt and fish, and in the winter to gather food supplies. Another group, the Oshara tradition people, who lived from 5,500 BCE to 600 CE, were part of the Archaic Southwest.

Mound builders and pueblos 

The Adena began constructing large earthwork mounds around 600 BCE. They are the earliest known people to have been Mound Builders, however, there are mounds in the United States that predate this culture. Watson Brake is an 11-mound complex in Louisiana that dates to 3,500 BCE, and nearby Poverty Point, built by the Poverty Point culture, is an earthwork complex that dates to 1,700 BCE. These mounds likely served a religious purpose.

The Adenans were absorbed into the Hopewell tradition, a powerful people who traded tools and goods across a wide territory. They continued the Adena tradition of mound-building, with remnants of several thousand still in existence across the core of their former territory in southern Ohio. The Hopewell pioneered a trading system called the Hopewell Exchange System, which at its greatest extent ran from the present-day Southeast up to the Canadian side of Lake Ontario. By 500 CE, the Hopewellians had too disappeared, absorbed into the larger Mississippian culture.

The Mississippians were a broad group of tribes. Their most important city was Cahokia, near modern-day St. Louis, Missouri. At its peak in the 12th century, the city had an estimated population of 20,000, larger than the population of London at the time. Cahokia, like many other cities and villages of the time, depended on hunting, foraging, trading, and agriculture, and developed a class system with slaves and human sacrifice that was influenced by societies to the south, like the Mayans.

In the Southwest, the Anasazi began constructing stone and adobe pueblos around 900 BCE. These apartment-like structures were often built into cliff faces, as seen in the Cliff Palace at Mesa Verde. Some grew to be the size of cities, with Pueblo Bonito along the Chaco River in New Mexico once consisting of 800 rooms.

Northwest and northeast 

The indigenous peoples of the Pacific Northwest were likely the most affluent Native Americans. Many distinct cultural groups and political entities developed there, but they all shared certain beliefs, traditions, and practices, such as the centrality of salmon as a resource and spiritual symbol. Permanent villages began to develop in this region as early as 1,000 BCE, and these communities celebrated by the gift-giving feast of the potlatch. These gatherings were usually organized to commemorate special events such as the raising of a Totem pole or the celebration of a new chief.

In present-day upstate New York, the Iroquois formed a confederacy of tribal peoples in the mid-15th century, consisting of the Oneida, Mohawk, Onondaga, Cayuga, and Seneca. Their system of affiliation was a kind of federation, different from the strong, centralized European monarchies. Each tribe had seats in a group of 50 sachem chiefs. It has been suggested that their culture contributed to political thinking during the development of the United States government. The Iroquois were powerful, waging war with many neighboring tribes, and later, Europeans. As their territory expanded, smaller tribes were forced further west, including the Osage, Kaw, Ponca, and Omaha peoples.

Native Hawaiians

The exact date for the settling of Hawaii is disputed but the first settlement most likely took place between 940 and 1130 CE. Around 1200 CE, Tahitian explorers found and began settling the area as well establishing a new caste system. This marked the rise of the Hawaiian civilization, which would be largely separated from the rest of the world until the arrival of the British 600 years later. Europeans under the British explorer James Cook arrived in the Hawaiian Islands in 1778, and within five years of contact, European military technology would help Kamehameha I conquer most of the island group, and eventually unify the islands for the first time; establishing the Hawaiian Kingdom.

Puerto Rico

The island of Puerto Rico has been settled for at least for 4,000 years dating back to the remains of Puerto Ferro man. Starting with the Ortoiroid culture, successive generations of native migrations arrived replacing or absorbing local populations. By the year 1000 Arawak people had arrived from South America via the Lesser Antilles, these settlers would become the Taíno encountered by the Spanish in 1493. Upon European contact a native population between 30,000 and 60,000 was likely, led by a single chief called a Cacique. Colonization resulted in the decimation of the local inhabitants due to the harsh Encomienda system and epidemics caused by Old World diseases. Puerto Rico would remain a part of Spain until American annexation in 1898.

Norse exploration

The earliest recorded European mention of America is in a historical treatise by the medieval chronicler Adam of Bremen, circa 1075, where it is referred to as Vinland. It is also extensively referred to in the 13th-century Norse Vinland sagas, which relate to events which occurred around 1000. Whilst the strongest archaeological evidence of the existence of Norse settlements in America is located in Canada, most notably at L'Anse aux Meadows and dated to circa 1000, there is significant scholarly debate as to whether Norse explorers also made landfall in New England and other east-coast areas. In 1925, President Calvin Coolidge declared that a Norse explorer called Leif Erikson (c.970 – c.1020) was the first European to discover America.

European colonization 

After a period of exploration sponsored by major European states, the first successful English settlement was established in 1607. Europeans brought horses, cattle, and hogs to the Americas and, in turn, took back maize, turkeys, tomatoes, potatoes, tobacco, beans, and squash to Europe. Many explorers and early settlers died after being exposed to new diseases in the Americas. However, the effects of new Eurasian diseases carried by the colonists, especially smallpox and measles, were much worse for the Native Americans, as they had no immunity to them. They suffered epidemics and died in very large numbers, usually before large-scale European settlement began. Their societies were disrupted and hollowed out by the scale of deaths.

First settlements

Spanish contact 

Spanish explorers were the first Europeans to reach the present-day United States, after Christopher Columbus's expeditions (beginning in 1492) established possessions in the Caribbean, including the modern-day U.S. territories of Puerto Rico, and parts of the U.S. Virgin Islands. Juan Ponce de León landed in Florida in 1513. Spanish expeditions quickly reached the Appalachian Mountains, the Mississippi River, the Grand Canyon, and the Great Plains.

In 1539, Hernando de Soto extensively explored the Southeast, and a year later Francisco Coronado explored from Arizona to central Kansas in search of gold. Escaped horses from Coronado's party spread over the Great Plains, and the Plains Indians mastered horsemanship within a few generations. Small Spanish settlements eventually grew to become important cities, such as San Antonio, Albuquerque, Tucson, Los Angeles, and San Francisco.

Dutch mid-Atlantic 

The Dutch West India Company sent explorer Henry Hudson to search for a Northwest Passage to Asia in 1609. New Netherland was established in 1621 by the company to capitalize on the North American fur trade. Growth was slow at first due to mismanagement by the Dutch and Native American conflicts. After the Dutch purchased the island of Manhattan from the Native Americans for a reported price of US$24, the land was named New Amsterdam and became the capital of New Netherland. The town rapidly expanded and in the mid-1600s it became an important trading center and port. Despite being Calvinists and building the Reformed Church in America, the Dutch were tolerant of other religions and cultures and traded with the Iroquois to the north.

The colony served as a barrier to British expansion from New England, and as a result a series of wars were fought. The colony was taken over by Britain as New York in 1664 and its capital was renamed New York City. New Netherland left an enduring legacy on American cultural and political life of religious tolerance and sensible trade in urban areas and rural traditionalism in the countryside (typified by the story of Rip Van Winkle). Notable Americans of Dutch descent include Martin Van Buren, Theodore Roosevelt, Franklin D. Roosevelt, Eleanor Roosevelt and the Frelinghuysens.

Swedish settlement 

In the early years of the Swedish Empire, Swedish, Dutch, and German stockholders formed the New Sweden Company to trade furs and tobacco in North America. The company's first expedition was led by Peter Minuit, who had been governor of New Netherland from 1626 to 1631 but left after a dispute with the Dutch government, and landed in Delaware Bay in March 1638. The settlers founded Fort Christina at the site of modern-day Wilmington, Delaware, and made treaties with the indigenous groups for land ownership on both sides of the Delaware River.

Over the following seventeen years, 12 more expeditions brought settlers from the Swedish Empire (which also included contemporary Finland, Estonia, and portions of Latvia, Norway, Russia, Poland, and Germany) to New Sweden. The colony established 19 permanent settlements along with many farms, extending into modern-day Maryland, Pennsylvania, and New Jersey. It was incorporated into New Netherland in 1655 after a Dutch invasion from the neighboring New Netherland colony during the Second Northern War.

French and Spanish conflict 
Giovanni da Verrazzano landed in North Carolina in 1524, and was the first European to sail into New York Harbor and Narragansett Bay. A decade later, Jacques Cartier sailed in search of the Northwest Passage, but instead discovered the Saint Lawrence River and laid the foundation for French colonization of the Americas in New France. After the collapse of the first Quebec colony in the 1540s, French Huguenots settled at Fort Caroline near present-day Jacksonville in Florida. In 1565, Spanish forces led by Pedro Menéndez destroyed the settlement and established the first European settlement in what would become the United States — St. Augustine.

After this, the French mostly remained in Quebec and Acadia, but far-reaching trade relationships with Native Americans throughout the Great Lakes and Midwest spread their influence. French colonists in small villages along the Mississippi and Illinois rivers lived in farming communities that served as a grain source for Gulf Coast settlements. The French established plantations in Louisiana along with settling New Orleans, Mobile and Biloxi.

British colonies 

The English, drawn in by Francis Drake's raids on Spanish treasure ships leaving the New World, settled the strip of land along the east coast in the 1600s. The first British colony in North America was established at Roanoke by Walter Raleigh in 1585, but failed. It would be twenty years before another attempt.

The early British colonies were established by private groups seeking profit, and were marked by starvation, disease, and Native American attacks. Many immigrants were people seeking religious freedom or escaping political oppression, peasants displaced by the Industrial Revolution, or those simply seeking adventure and opportunity.

In some areas, Native Americans taught colonists how to plant and harvest the native crops. In others, they attacked the settlers. Virgin forests provided an ample supply of building material and firewood. Natural inlets and harbors lined the coast, providing easy ports for essential trade with Europe. Settlements remained close to the coast due to this as well as Native American resistance and the Appalachian Mountains that were found in the interior.

First settlement in Jamestown 

The first successful English colony, Jamestown, was established by the Virginia Company in 1607 on the James River in Virginia. The colonists were preoccupied with the search for gold and were ill-equipped for life in the New World. Captain John Smith held the fledgling Jamestown together in the first year, and the colony descended into anarchy and nearly failed when he returned to England two years later. John Rolfe began experimenting with tobacco from the West Indies in 1612, and by 1614 the first shipment arrived in London. It became Virginia's chief source of revenue within a decade.

In 1624, after years of disease and Indian attacks, including the Powhatan attack of 1622, King James I revoked the Virginia Company's charter and made Virginia a royal colony.

New England Colonies 

New England was initially settled primarily by Puritans fleeing religious persecution. The Pilgrims sailed for Virginia on the Mayflower in 1620, but were knocked off course by a storm and landed at Plymouth, where they agreed to a social contract of rules in the Mayflower Compact. Like Jamestown, Plymouth suffered from disease and starvation, but local Wampanoag Indians taught the colonists how to farm maize.

Plymouth was followed by the Puritans and Massachusetts Bay Colony in 1630. They maintained a charter for self-government separate from England, and elected founder John Winthrop as the governor for most of its early years. Roger Williams opposed Winthrop's treatment of Native Americans and religious intolerance, and established the colony of Providence Plantations, later Rhode Island, on the basis of freedom of religion. Other colonists established settlements in the Connecticut River Valley, and on the coasts of present-day New Hampshire and Maine. Native American attacks continued, with the most significant occurring in the 1637 Pequot War and the 1675 King Philip's War.

New England became a center of commerce and industry due to the poor, mountainous soil making agriculture difficult. Rivers were harnessed to power grain mills and sawmills, and the numerous harbors facilitated trade. Tight-knit villages developed around these industrial centers, and Boston became one of America's most important ports.

Middle Colonies 

In the 1660s, the Middle Colonies of New York, New Jersey, and Delaware were established in the former Dutch New Netherland, and were characterized by a large degree of ethnic and religious diversity. At the same time, the Iroquois of New York, strengthened by years of fur trading with Europeans, formed the powerful Iroquois Confederacy.

The last colony in this region was Pennsylvania, established in 1681 by William Penn as a home for religious dissenters, including Quakers, Methodists, and the Amish. The capital of the colony, Philadelphia, became a dominant commercial center in a few short years, with busy docks and brick houses. While Quakers populated the city, German immigrants began to flood into the Pennsylvanian hills and forests, while the Scots-Irish pushed into the far western frontier.

Southern Colonies 

The overwhelmingly rural Southern Colonies contrasted sharply with the New England and Middle Colonies. After Virginia, the second British colony south of New England was Maryland, established as a Catholic haven in 1632. The economy of these two colonies was built entirely on yeoman farmers and planters. The planters established themselves in the Tidewater region of Virginia, establishing massive plantations with slave labor.

In 1670, the Province of Carolina was established, and Charleston became the region's great trading port. While Virginia's economy was also based on tobacco, Carolina was more diversified, exporting rice, indigo, and lumber as well. In 1712, it was divided in two, creating North and South Carolina. The Georgia Colony – the last of the Thirteen Colonies – was established by James Oglethorpe in 1732 as a border to Spanish Florida and a reform colony for former prisoners and the poor.

Religion 

Religiosity expanded greatly after the First Great Awakening, a religious revival in the 1740s which was led by preachers such as Jonathan Edwards and George Whitefield. American Evangelicals affected by the Awakening added a new emphasis on divine outpourings of the Holy Spirit and conversions that implanted new believers with an intense love for God. Revivals encapsulated those hallmarks and carried the newly created evangelicalism into the early republic, setting the stage for the Second Great Awakening in the late 1790s. In the early stages, evangelicals in the South, such as Methodists and Baptists, preached for religious freedom and abolition of slavery; they converted many slaves and recognized some as preachers.

Government 

Each of the 13 American colonies had a slightly different governmental structure. Typically, a colony was ruled by a governor appointed from London who controlled the executive administration and relied upon a locally elected legislature to vote on taxes and make laws. By the 18th century, the American colonies were growing very rapidly as a result of low death rates along with ample supplies of land and food. The colonies were richer than most parts of Britain, and attracted a steady flow of immigrants, especially teenagers who arrived as indentured servants.

Servitude and slavery 

Over half of all European immigrants to Colonial America arrived as indentured servants. Few could afford the cost of the journey to America, and so this form of unfree labor provided a means to immigrate. Typically, people would sign a contract agreeing to a set term of labor, usually four to seven years, and in return would receive transport to America and a piece of land at the end of their servitude. In some cases, ships' captains received rewards for the delivery of poor migrants, and so extravagant promises and kidnapping were common. The Virginia Company and the Massachusetts Bay Company also used indentured servant labor.

The first African slaves were brought to Virginia in 1619, just twelve years after the founding of Jamestown. Initially regarded as indentured servants who could buy their freedom, the institution of slavery began to harden and the involuntary servitude became lifelong as the demand for labor on tobacco and rice plantations grew in the 1660s. Slavery became identified with brown skin color, at the time seen as a "black race", and the children of slave women were born slaves (partus sequitur ventrem). By the 1770s African slaves comprised a fifth of the American population.

The question of independence from Britain did not arise as long as the colonies needed British military support against the French and Spanish powers. Those threats were gone by 1765. However, London continued to regard the American colonies as existing for the benefit of the mother country in a policy known as mercantilism.

Colonial America was defined by a severe labor shortage that used forms of unfree labor, such as slavery and indentured servitude. The British colonies were also marked by a policy of avoiding strict enforcement of parliamentary laws, known as salutary neglect. This permitted the development of an American spirit distinct from that of its European founders.

Road to independence 

An upper-class emerged in South Carolina and Virginia, with wealth based on large plantations operated by slave labor. A unique class system operated in upstate New York, where Dutch tenant farmers rented land from very wealthy Dutch proprietors, such as the Van Rensselaer family. The other colonies were more egalitarian, with Pennsylvania being representative. By the mid-18th century Pennsylvania was basically a middle-class colony with limited respect for its small upper-class. A writer in the Pennsylvania Journal in 1756 wrote:

Political integration and autonomy 

The French and Indian War (1754–1763), part of the larger Seven Years' War, was a watershed event in the political development of the colonies. The influence of the French and Native Americans, the main rivals of the British Crown in the colonies and Canada, was significantly reduced and the territory of the Thirteen Colonies expanded into New France, both in Canada and Louisiana.  The war effort also resulted in greater political integration of the colonies, as reflected in the Albany Congress and symbolized by Benjamin Franklin's call for the colonies to "Join, or Die." Franklin was a man of many inventions – one of which was the concept of a United States of America, which emerged after 1765 and would be realized a decade later.

Taxation without representation 

Following Britain's acquisition of French territory in North America, King George III issued the Royal Proclamation of 1763, with the goal of organizing the new North American empire and protecting the Native Americans from colonial expansion into western lands beyond the Appalachian Mountains. In the following years, strains developed in the relations between the colonists and the Crown. The British Parliament passed the Stamp Act of 1765, imposing a tax on the colonies, without going through the colonial legislatures. The issue was drawn: did Parliament have the right to tax Americans who were not represented in it? Crying "No taxation without representation", the colonists refused to pay the taxes as tensions escalated in the late 1760s and early 1770s.

The Boston Tea Party in 1773 was a direct action by activists in the town of Boston to protest against the new tax on tea. Parliament quickly responded the next year with the Intolerable Acts, stripping Massachusetts of its historic right of self-government and putting it under military rule, which sparked outrage and resistance in all thirteen colonies. Patriot leaders from every colony convened the First Continental Congress to coordinate their resistance to the Intolerable Acts. The Congress called for a boycott of British trade, published a list of rights and grievances, and petitioned the king to rectify those grievances. This appeal to the Crown had no effect, though, and so the Second Continental Congress was convened in 1775 to organize the defense of the colonies against the British Army.

Common people became insurgents against the British even though they were unfamiliar with the ideological rationales being offered. They held very strongly a sense of "rights" that they felt the British were deliberately violating – rights that stressed local autonomy, fair dealing, and government by consent. They were highly sensitive to the issue of tyranny, which they saw manifested by the arrival in Boston of the British Army to punish the Bostonians. This heightened their sense of violated rights, leading to rage and demands for revenge, and they had faith that God was on their side.

Revolution and independence 

The American Revolutionary War began at Lexington and Concord in Massachusetts in April 1775 when the British tried to seize ammunition supplies and arrest the Patriot leaders.

In terms of political values, the Americans were largely united on a concept called Republicanism, which rejected aristocracy and emphasized civic duty and a fear of corruption. For the Founding Fathers, according to one team of historians, "republicanism represented more than a particular form of government. It was a way of life, a core ideology, an uncompromising commitment to liberty, and a total rejection of aristocracy."

The Thirteen Colonies began a rebellion against British rule in 1775 and proclaimed their independence in 1776 as the United States of America. In the American Revolutionary War (1775–1783) the Americans captured the British invasion army at Saratoga in 1777, secured the Northeast and encouraged the French to make a military alliance with the United States. France brought in Spain and the Netherlands, thus balancing the military and naval forces on each side as Britain had no allies.

George Washington 

General George Washington proved an excellent organizer and administrator who worked successfully with Congress and the state governors, selecting and mentoring his senior officers, supporting and training his troops, and maintaining an idealistic Republican Army. His biggest challenge was logistics because neither Congress nor the states had the funding to provide adequately for the equipment, munitions, clothing, paychecks, or even the food supply of the soldiers.

As a battlefield tactician, Washington often was outmaneuvered by his British counterparts. As a strategist, however, he had a better idea of how to win the war than they did. The British sent four invasion armies. Washington's strategy forced the first army out of Boston in 1776, and was responsible for the surrender of the second and third armies at Saratoga (1777) and Yorktown (1781). He limited the British control to New York City and a few places while keeping Patriot control of the great majority of the population.

Loyalists and Britain 

The Loyalists, whom the British counted upon heavily, comprised about 20% of the population but suffered weak organization. As the war ended, the final British army sailed out of New York City in November 1783, taking the Loyalist leadership with them. Washington unexpectedly then, instead of seizing power for himself, retired to his farm in Virginia. Political scientist Seymour Martin Lipset observes, "The United States was the first major colony successfully to revolt against colonial rule. In this sense, it was the first 'new nation'."

Declaration of Independence 

On July 2, 1776, the Second Continental Congress, meeting in Philadelphia, declared the independence of the colonies by adopting the resolution from Richard Henry Lee, that stated:

On July 4, 1776, they adopted the Declaration of Independence and this date is celebrated as the country's birthday. Congress shortly thereafter officially changed the name of the union to the "United States of America" from the "United Colonies of America".

The new country was founded on Enlightenment ideals of liberalism and what Thomas Jefferson called the unalienable rights to "life, liberty and the pursuit of happiness". It was dedicated strongly to republican principles, which emphasized that people are sovereign (not hereditary kings), demanded civic duty, feared corruption, and rejected any aristocracy.

Early years of the republic

Confederation and constitution 

In the 1780s the national government was able to settle the issue of the western regions of the young United States, which were ceded by the states to Congress and became territories. With the migration of settlers to the Northwest, soon they became states. Nationalists worried that the confederate nature of the union was too fragile to withstand an armed conflict with any adversarial states, or even internal revolts such as the Shays' Rebellion of 1786 in Massachusetts.

Nationalists – most of them war veterans – organized in every state and convinced Congress to call the Philadelphia Convention in 1787. The delegates from every state wrote a new Constitution that created a much more powerful and efficient central government, one with a strong president, and powers of taxation. The new government reflected the prevailing republican ideals of guarantees of individual liberty and of constraining the power of government through a system of separation of powers.

The Congress was given authority to ban the international slave trade after 20 years (which it did in 1807). The Three-fifths Compromise gave the South Congressional apportionment out of proportion to its free population by allowing it to include three-fifths of the number of slaves in each state's total population. This provision increased the political power of southern representatives in the United States Congress, especially as slavery was extended into the Deep South through removal of Native Americans and transportation of slaves by an extensive domestic slave trade.

To assuage the Anti-Federalists who feared a too-powerful central government, the Congress adopted the United States Bill of Rights in 1791. Comprising the first ten amendments of the Constitution, it guaranteed individual liberties such as freedom of speech and religious practice, jury trials, and stated that citizens and states had reserved rights (which were not specified).

President George Washington 

George Washington – a renowned hero of the American Revolutionary War, commander-in-chief of the Continental Army, and president of the Constitutional Convention – became the first President of the United States under the new Constitution in 1789. The national capital moved from New York to Philadelphia in 1790 and finally settled in Washington D.C. in 1800.

The major accomplishments of the Washington Administration were creating a strong national government that was recognized without question by all Americans. His government, following the vigorous leadership of Treasury Secretary Alexander Hamilton, assumed the debts of the states (the debt holders received federal bonds), created the Bank of the United States to stabilize the financial system, and set up a uniform system of tariffs (taxes on imports) and other taxes to pay off the debt and provide a financial infrastructure. To support his programs Hamilton created a new political party – the first in the world based on voters – the Federalist Party.

Two-party system 

Thomas Jefferson and James Madison formed an opposition Republican Party (usually called the Democratic-Republican Party by political scientists). Hamilton and Washington presented the country in 1794 with the Jay Treaty that reestablished good relations with Britain. The Jeffersonians vehemently protested, and the voters aligned behind one party or the other, thus setting up the First Party System. Federalists promoted business, financial and commercial interests and wanted more trade with Britain. Republicans accused the Federalists of plans to establish a monarchy, turn the rich into a ruling class, and making the United States a pawn of the British. The treaty passed, but politics became intensely heated.

Challenges to the federal government 

Serious challenges to the new federal government included the Northwest Indian War, the ongoing Cherokee–American wars, and the 1794 Whiskey Rebellion, in which western settlers protested against a federal tax on liquor. Washington called the state militia and personally led an army against the settlers, as the insurgents melted away and the power of the federal government was firmly established.

Washington refused to serve more than two terms – setting a precedent – and in his famous farewell address, he extolled the benefits of federal government and importance of ethics and morality while warning against foreign alliances and the formation of political parties.

John Adams, a Federalist, defeated Jefferson in the 1796 election. War loomed with France and the Federalists used the opportunity to try to silence the Republicans with the Alien and Sedition Acts, build up a large army with Hamilton at the head, and prepare for a French invasion. However, the Federalists became divided after Adams sent a successful peace mission to France that ended the Quasi-War of 1798.

Increasing demand for slave labor 

During the first two decades after the Revolutionary War, there were dramatic changes in the status of slavery among the states and an increase in the number of freed blacks. Inspired by revolutionary ideals of the equality of men and influenced by their lesser economic reliance on slavery, northern states abolished slavery.

States of the Upper South made manumission easier, resulting in an increase in the proportion of free blacks in the Upper South (as a percentage of the total non-white population) from less than one percent in 1792 to more than 10 percent by 1810. By that date, a total of 13.5 percent of all blacks in the United States were free. After that date, with the demand for slaves on the rise because of the Deep South's expanding cotton cultivation, the number of manumissions declined sharply; and an internal U.S. slave trade became an important source of wealth for many planters and traders.

In 1807, Congress severed the U.S.'s involvement with the Atlantic slave trade.

Louisiana and Jeffersonian republicanism 

Jefferson defeated Adams massively for the presidency in the 1800 election. Jefferson's major achievement as president was the Louisiana Purchase in 1803, which provided U.S. settlers with vast potential for expansion west of the Mississippi River.
Jefferson, a scientist, supported expeditions to explore and map the new domain, most notably the Lewis and Clark Expedition. Jefferson believed deeply in republicanism and argued it should be based on the independent yeoman farmer and planter; he distrusted cities, factories and banks. He also distrusted the federal government and judges, and tried to weaken the judiciary. However he met his match in John Marshall, a Federalist from Virginia. Although the Constitution specified a Supreme Court, its functions were vague until Marshall, the Chief Justice of the United States (1801–1835), defined them, especially the power to overturn acts of Congress or states that violated the Constitution, first enunciated in 1803 in Marbury v. Madison.

War of 1812 

Americans were increasingly angry at the British violation of American ships' neutral rights to hurt France, the impressment (seizure) of 10,000 American sailors needed by the Royal Navy to fight Napoleon, and British support for hostile Indians attacking American settlers in the American Midwest with the goal of creating a pro-British Indian barrier state to block American expansion westward. They may also have desired to annex all or part of British North America, although this is still heavily debated. Despite strong opposition from the Northeast, especially from Federalists who did not want to disrupt trade with Britain, Congress declared war on June 18, 1812.

The war was frustrating for both sides. Both sides tried to invade the other and were repulsed. The American high command remained incompetent until the last year. The American militia proved ineffective because the soldiers were reluctant to leave home and efforts to invade Canada repeatedly failed. The British blockade ruined American commerce, bankrupted the Treasury, and further angered New Englanders, who smuggled supplies to Britain. The Americans under General William Henry Harrison finally gained naval control of Lake Erie and defeated the Indians under Tecumseh in Canada, while Andrew Jackson ended the Indian threat in the Southeast. The Indian threat to expansion into the Midwest was permanently ended. The British invaded and occupied much of Maine.

The British raided and burned Washington, but were repelled at Baltimore in 1814 – where the "Star Spangled Banner" was written to celebrate the American success. In upstate New York a major British invasion of New York State was turned back at the Battle of Plattsburgh. Finally in early 1815 Andrew Jackson decisively defeated a major British invasion at the Battle of New Orleans, making him the most famous war hero.

With Napoleon (apparently) gone, the causes of the war had evaporated and both sides agreed to a peace that left the prewar boundaries intact. Americans claimed victory on February 18, 1815, as news came almost simultaneously of Jackson's victory of New Orleans and the peace treaty that left the prewar boundaries in place. Americans swelled with pride at success in the "second war of independence"; the naysayers of the antiwar Federalist Party were put to shame and the party never recovered. This helped lead to an emerging American identity that cemented national pride over state pride.

Britain never achieved the war goal of granting the Indians a barrier state to block further American settlement and this allowed settlers to pour into the Midwest without fear of a major threat. The War of 1812 also destroyed America's negative perception of a standing army, which was proved useful in many areas against the British as opposed to ill-equipped and poorly-trained militias in the early months of the war, and War Department officials instead decided to place regular troops as the main military capabilities of the government.

Second Great Awakening 

The Second Great Awakening was a Protestant revival movement that affected virtually all of society during the early 19th century and led to rapid church growth. The movement began around 1790, gained momentum by 1800, and, after 1820 membership rose rapidly among Baptist and Methodist congregations, whose preachers led the movement. It was past its peak by the 1840s.

It enrolled millions of new members in existing evangelical denominations and led to the formation of new denominations. Many converts believed that the Awakening heralded a new millennial age. The Second Great Awakening stimulated the establishment of many reform movements – including abolitionism and temperance designed to remove the evils of society before the anticipated Second Coming of Jesus Christ.

Era of Good Feelings 

As strong opponents of the War of 1812, the Federalists held the Hartford Convention in 1814 that hinted at disunion. National euphoria after the victory at New Orleans ruined the prestige of the Federalists and they no longer played a significant role as a political party. President Madison and most Republicans realized they were foolish to let the First Bank of the United States close down, for its absence greatly hindered the financing of the war. So, with the assistance of foreign bankers, they chartered the Second Bank of the United States in 1816.

The Republicans also imposed tariffs designed to protect the infant industries that had been created when Britain was blockading the U.S. With the collapse of the Federalists as a party, the adoption of many Federalist principles by the Republicans, and the systematic policy of President James Monroe in his two terms (1817–1825) to downplay partisanship, society entered an Era of Good Feelings, with far less partisanship than before (or after), and closed out the First Party System.

The Monroe Doctrine, expressed in 1823, proclaimed the United States' opinion that European powers should no longer colonize or interfere in the Americas. This was a defining moment in the foreign policy of the United States. The Monroe Doctrine was adopted in response to American and British fears over Russian and French expansion into the Western Hemisphere.

In 1832, President Andrew Jackson, 7th President of the United States, ran for a second term under the slogan "Jackson and no bank" and did not renew the charter of the Second Bank, dissolving the bank in 1836. Jackson was convinced that central banking was used by the elite to take advantage of the average American, and instead implemented publicly owned banks in various states, popularly known as "pet banks".

Westward expansion

Indian removal 

In 1830, Congress passed the Indian Removal Act, which authorized the president to negotiate treaties that exchanged Native American tribal lands in the eastern states for lands west of the Mississippi River. Its goal was primarily to remove Native Americans, including the Five Civilized Tribes, from the American Southeast – they occupied land that settlers wanted.

Jacksonian Democrats demanded the forcible removal of native populations who refused to acknowledge state laws to reservations in the West. Whigs and religious leaders opposed the move as inhumane. Thousands of deaths resulted from the relocations, as seen in the Cherokee Trail of Tears. The Trail of Tears resulted in approximately 2,000–8,000 of the 16,543 relocated Cherokee perishing along the way. Many of the Seminole Indians in Florida refused to move west; they fought the Army for years in the Seminole Wars.

Second party system 

After the First Party System of Federalists and Republicans withered away in the 1820s, the stage was set for the emergence of a new party system based on well organized local parties that appealed for the votes of (almost) all adult white men. The former Jeffersonian (Democratic-Republican) party split into factions. They split over the choice of a successor to President James Monroe, and the party faction that supported many of the old Jeffersonian principles, led by Andrew Jackson and Martin Van Buren, became the Democratic Party. As Norton explains the transformation in 1828:

Opposing factions led by Henry Clay helped form the Whig Party. The Democratic Party had a small but decisive advantage over the Whigs until the 1850s, when the Whigs fell apart over the issue of slavery.

The great majority of anti-slavery activists, such as Abraham Lincoln and Mr. Walters, rejected Garrison's theology and held that slavery was an unfortunate social evil, not a sin.

Westward expansion and Manifest Destiny 

The American colonies and the newly formed union grew rapidly in population and area, as pioneers pushed the frontier of settlement west. The process finally ended around 1890–1912 as the last major farmlands and ranch lands were settled. Native American tribes in some places resisted militarily, but they were overwhelmed by settlers and the army and after 1830 were relocated to reservations in the west. The highly influential "Frontier thesis" of Wisconsin historian Frederick Jackson Turner argues that the frontier shaped the national character, with its boldness, violence, innovation, individualism, and democracy.

Recent historians have emphasized the multicultural nature of the frontier. Enormous popular attention in the media focuses on the "Wild West" of the second half of the 19th century. As defined by Hine and Faragher, "frontier history tells the story of the creation and defense of communities, the use of the land, the development of markets, and the formation of states". They explain, "It is a tale of conquest, but also one of survival, persistence, and the merging of peoples and cultures that gave birth and continuing life to America."

The first settlers in the west were the Spanish in New Mexico; they became U.S. citizens in 1848. The Hispanics in California ("Californios") were overwhelmed by over 100,000 California Gold Rush miners. California grew explosively. San Francisco by 1880 had become the economic hub of the entire Pacific Coast with a diverse population of a quarter million.

From the early 1830s to 1869, the Oregon Trail and its many offshoots were used by over 300,000 settlers. '49ers (in the California Gold Rush), ranchers, farmers, and entrepreneurs and their families headed to California, Oregon, and other points in the far west. Wagon-trains took five or six months on foot; after 1869, the trip took 6 days by rail.

Manifest destiny was the belief that American settlers were destined to expand across the continent. This concept was born out of "A sense of mission to redeem the Old World by high example ... generated by the potentialities of a new earth for building a new heaven". Manifest Destiny was rejected by modernizers, especially the Whigs like Henry Clay and Abraham Lincoln who wanted to build cities and factories – not more farms. Democrats strongly favored expansion, and won the key election of 1844. After a bitter debate in Congress the Republic of Texas was annexed in 1845, leading to war with Mexico, who considered Texas to be a part of Mexico due to the large numbers of Mexican settlers.

The Mexican–American War (1846–1848) broke out with the Whigs opposed to the war, and the Democrats supporting the war. The U.S. army, using regulars and large numbers of volunteers, defeated the Mexican armies, invaded at several points, captured Mexico City and won decisively. The Treaty of Guadalupe Hidalgo ended the war in 1848. Many Democrats wanted to annex all of Mexico, but that idea was rejected by White Southerners who argued that by incorporating millions of Mexican people, mainly of mixed race, would undermine the United States as an exclusively white republic.

Instead the U.S. took Texas and the lightly settled northern parts (California and New Mexico). The Hispanic residents were given full citizenship and the Mexican Indians became American Indians. Simultaneously, gold was discovered in California in 1849, attracting over 100,000 men to northern California in a matter of months in the California Gold Rush. To clear the state for settlers, the U.S. government began a policy of extermination since termed the California genocide. A peaceful compromise with Britain gave the U.S. ownership of the Oregon Country, which was renamed the Oregon Territory.

The demand for guano (prized as an agricultural fertilizer) led the United States to pass the Guano Islands Act in 1856, which enabled citizens of the United States to take possession, in the name of the United States, of unclaimed islands containing guano deposits. Under the act the United States annexed nearly 100 islands in the Pacific Ocean and the Caribbean Sea. By 1903, 66 of these islands were recognized as territories of the United States.

Sectional conflict and Civil War

Divisions between North and South 

The central issue after 1848 was the expansion of slavery, with the anti-slavery elements in the North pitted against the pro-slavery elements that dominated the South. A small number of active Northerners were abolitionists who declared that ownership of slaves was a sin (in terms of Protestant theology) and demanded its immediate abolition. Much larger numbers in the North were against the expansion of slavery, seeking to put it on the path to extinction so that America would be committed to free land (as in low-cost farms owned and cultivated by a family), free labor, and free speech (as opposed to censorship of abolitionist material in the South). Southern white Democrats insisted that slavery was of economic, social, and cultural benefit to all whites (and even to the slaves themselves), and denounced all anti-slavery spokesmen as "abolitionists".

Justifications of slavery included economics, history, religion, legality, social good, and even humanitarianism. Defenders of slavery argued that the sudden end to the slave economy would have had a profound and fatal economic impact in the South where reliance on slave labor was the foundation of their economy. They also argued that if all the slaves were freed, there would be widespread unemployment and chaos.

Religious activists were split on slavery, with the Methodists and Baptists dividing into northern and southern denominations. In the North, the Methodists, Congregationalists, and Quakers included many abolitionists, especially among women activists. (The Catholic, Episcopal and Lutheran denominations largely ignored the slavery issue.)

Compromise of 1850 and popular sovereignty 

The issue of slavery in the new territories was seemingly settled by the Compromise of 1850, brokered by Whig Henry Clay and Democrat Stephen Douglas; the Compromise included the admission of California as a free state in exchange for no federal restrictions on slavery placed on Utah or New Mexico. A point of contention was the Fugitive Slave Act, which increased federal enforcement and required even free states to cooperate in turning over fugitive slaves to their owners. Abolitionists highlighted the Act as particularly harmful in their fight against slavery, as evinced in the best-selling anti-slavery novel Uncle Tom's Cabin by Harriet Beecher Stowe.

The Compromise of 1820 was repealed in 1854 with the Kansas–Nebraska Act, promoted by Senator Douglas in the name of "popular sovereignty" and democracy. It permitted voters to decide on the legality of slavery in each territory, and allowed Douglas to adopt neutrality on the issue of slavery. Anti-slavery forces rose in anger and alarm, forming the new Republican Party. Pro- and anti- contingents rushed to Kansas to vote slavery up or down, resulting in a miniature civil war called Bleeding Kansas. By the late 1850s, the young Republican Party dominated nearly all northern states and thus the electoral college. It insisted that slavery would never be allowed to expand (and thus would slowly die out).

Plantation economy 

The Southern slavery-based societies had become wealthy based on their cotton and other agricultural commodity production, and some particularly profited from the internal slave trade. Northern cities such as Boston and New York, and regional industries, were tied economically to slavery by banking, shipping, and manufacturing, including textile mills. By 1860, there were four million slaves in the South, nearly eight times as many as there were nationwide in 1790. The plantations were highly profitable, due to the heavy European demand for raw cotton. Most of the profits were invested in new lands and in purchasing more slaves (largely drawn from the declining tobacco regions).

For the 50 of the country's first 72 years, a slaveholder served as President of the United States and, during that period, only slaveholding presidents were re-elected to second terms. In addition, southern states benefited by their increased apportionment in Congress due to the partial counting of slaves in their populations.

Slave rebellions and Abolitionism 

There was resistance to slavery by both peaceful and violent means. Slave rebellions, by Gabriel Prosser (1800), Denmark Vesey (1822), Nat Turner (1831), and most famously by John Brown (1859), caused fear in the white South, which imposed stricter oversight of slaves and reduced the rights of free blacks. 

Abolitionism grew in the north in the decades before the Civil War, while southern states entrenched themselves on upholding slavery fiercely. Former slaves Frederick Douglass and Harriet Tubman became leading advocates for abolition. However, before 1860 only a minority of northern whites supported abolition, which was often seen as a 'radical' measure. There were violent reactions to abolitionist advocates in the north, notably the burning of an anti slavery society in Pennsylvania Hall. 

With political power in congress being a key flash-point between slave and free states The Fugitive Slave Act of 1850 required the states to cooperate with slave owners when attempting to recover escaped slaves, which outraged Northerners. Formerly, an escaped slave that reached a non-slave state was presumed to have attained sanctuary and freedom under the Missouri Compromise. The Supreme Court's 1857 decision in Dred Scott v. Sandford ruled that the Missouri Compromise was unconstitutional and that free blacks were not citizens of the United States; the decision enraged all major political forces except for southern states. The Republicans worried the decision could be used to expand slavery throughout all states and territories. With senator Abraham Lincoln leading criticism of the ruling, the stage was set for the 1860 presidential election.

President Abraham Lincoln and secession 

After Abraham Lincoln won the 1860 election, seven Southern states seceded from the union and set up a newly formed sovereign state, the Confederate States of America (Confederacy), on February 8, 1861. It attacked Fort Sumter, a U.S. Army fort in South Carolina, thus igniting the war. When Lincoln called for troops to suppress the Confederacy in April 1861, four more states seceded and joined the Confederacy. A few of the (northernmost) "slave states" did not secede and became known as the border states; these were Delaware, Maryland, Kentucky, and Missouri.

During the war, the northwestern portion of Virginia seceded from the Confederacy. and became the new Union state of West Virginia. West Virginia is usually associated with the border states.

Civil War 

The Civil War began April 12, 1861, when Confederate forces attacked a U.S. military installation at Fort Sumter in South Carolina. In response, Lincoln called on the states to send troops to recapture forts, protect the capital, and "preserve the Union," which in his view still existed intact despite the actions of the seceding states. The two armies had their first major clash at the First Battle of Bull Run, which proved to both sides that the war would be much longer and bloodier than originally anticipated.

In the western theater, the Union Army was relatively successful, with major battles, such as Perryville and Shiloh along with Union Navy gunboat dominance of navigable rivers producing strategic Union victories and destroying major Confederate operations.

Warfare in the eastern theater began poorly for the Union. U.S. General George B. McClellan failed to capture the Confederate capital of Richmond, Virginia in his Peninsula campaign and retreated after attacks from Confederate General Robert E. Lee. Meanwhile, both sides concentrated in 1861–1862 on raising and training new armies. The main action was Union success in controlling the border states, with Confederates largely driven out of border states.

The autumn 1862 Confederate retreat at the Battle of Antietam led to Lincoln's warning he would issue an Emancipation Proclamation in January 1863 if the states did not return. Making slavery a central war goal energized Republicans in the North, as well as their enemies, the anti-war Copperhead Democrats and ended the chance of British and French intervention.

Lee's smaller Army of Northern Virginia won battles in late 1862 and Spring 1863, but he pushed too hard and ignored the Union threat in the west. Lee invaded Pennsylvania in search of supplies and to cause war-weariness in the North. In perhaps the turning point of the war, Lee's army was badly beaten by the Army of the Potomac at the July 1863 Battle of Gettysburg and barely made it back to Virginia. Survivors of the Battle of Gettysburg were immedietely redployed to supress the New York City draft riots by Irish Americans first resisting Civil War conscription but later out of racism aganist the city's free black population.

In July 1863, Union forces under General Ulysses S. Grant gained control of the Mississippi River at the Battle of Vicksburg, thereby splitting the Confederacy. In 1864, Union General William Tecumseh Sherman marched south from Chattanooga to capture Atlanta, a decisive victory that ended war jitters among Republicans in the North and helped Lincoln win re-election.

On the homefront, industrial expansion in the North expanded dramatically, using its extensive railroad service, and moving industrial workers into munitions factories. Foreign trade increased, with the United States providing both food and cotton to Britain, and Britain sending in manufactured products and thousands of volunteers for the Union Army (plus a few to the Confederate army). The British operated blockade runners bringing in food, luxury items and munitions to the Confederacy, bringing out tobacco and cotton. The Union blockade increasingly shut down Confederate ports, and by late 1864 the blockade runners were usually captured before they could make more than a handful of runs.

The last two years of the war were bloody for both sides, with Sherman marching almost unopposed through southern states, burning cities, destroying plantations, ruining railroads and bridges, but avoiding civilian casualties. Sherman demonstrated that the South was unable to resist a Union invasion. Much of the Confederate heartland was destroyed, and could no longer provide desperately needed supplies to its armies. In spring 1864, Grant launched a war of attrition and pursued Lee to the final, Appomattox campaign which resulted in Lee surrendering in April 1865.

The American Civil War was the world's earliest industrial war. Railroads, the telegraph, steamships, and mass-produced weapons were employed extensively. The mobilization of civilian factories, mines, shipyards, banks, transportation and food supplies all foreshadowed the impact of industrialization in World War I. It remains the deadliest war in American history, resulting in the deaths of about 750,000 soldiers and an undetermined number of civilian casualties. About ten percent of all Northern males 20–45 years old, and 30 percent of all Southern white males aged 18–40 died. Its legacy includes ending slavery in the United States, restoring the Union, and strengthening the role of the federal government.

According to historian Allan Nevins, the Civil War had a major long-term impact on the United States in terms of developing its leadership potential and metaphorically moving the country beyond the adolescent stage:

Emancipation 

The Emancipation Proclamation was an executive order issued by President Abraham Lincoln on January 1, 1863. In a single stroke it changed the legal status, as recognized by the U.S. government, of 3 million slaves in designated areas of the Confederacy from "slave" to "free". It had the practical effect that as soon as a slave escaped the control of the Confederate government, by running away or through advances of federal troops, the slave became legally and actually free.

The owners were never compensated. Plantation owners, realizing that emancipation would destroy their economic system, sometimes moved their slaves as far as possible out of reach of the Union army. By June 1865, the Union Army controlled all of the Confederacy and liberated all of the designated slaves. Large numbers moved into camps run by the Freedmen's Bureau, where they were given food, shelter, medical care, and arrangements for their employment were made.

The severe dislocations of war and Reconstruction had a large negative impact on the black population, with a large amount of sickness and death.

Reconstruction 

Reconstruction lasted from Lincoln's Emancipation Proclamation of January 1, 1863, to the Compromise of 1877.

The major issues faced by Lincoln were the status of the ex-slaves ("Freedmen"), the loyalty and civil rights of ex-rebels, the status of the 11 ex-Confederate states, the powers of the federal government needed to prevent a future civil war, and the question of whether Congress or the President would make the major decisions.

The severe threats of starvation and displacement of the unemployed Freedmen were met by the first major federal relief agency, the Freedmen's Bureau, operated by the Army.

Three "Reconstruction Amendments" were passed to expand civil rights for black Americans: the Thirteenth Amendment outlawed slavery; the Fourteenth Amendment guaranteed equal rights for all and citizenship for blacks; the Fifteenth Amendment prevented race from being used to disenfranchise men.

Radical Reconstruction 

Ex-Confederates remained in control of most Southern states for over two years, but changed when the Radical Republicans gained control of Congress in the 1866 elections. President Andrew Johnson, who sought easy terms for reunions with ex-rebels, was virtually powerless in the face of the Radical Republican Congress; he was impeached, but the Senate's attempt to remove him from office failed by one vote. Congress enfranchised black men and temporarily stripped many ex-Confederate leaders of the right to hold office. New Republican governments came to power based on a coalition of Freedmen made up of Carpetbaggers (new arrivals from the North), and Scalawags (native white Southerners). They were backed by the U.S. Army. Opponents said they were corrupt and violated the rights of whites.

KKK and the rise of Jim Crow laws

State by state, the New Republicans lost power to a conservative-Democratic coalition, which gained control of the entire South by 1877. In response to Radical Reconstruction, the Ku Klux Klan (KKK) emerged in 1867 as a white-supremacist organization opposed to black civil rights and Republican rule. President Ulysses Grant's vigorous enforcement of the Ku Klux Klan Act of 1870 shut down the Klan, and it disbanded.

Paramilitary groups, such as the White League and Red Shirts emerged about 1874 that worked openly to use intimidation and violence to suppress black voting to regain white political power in states across the South during the 1870s. One historian described them as the military arm of the Democratic Party.

Reconstruction ended after the disputed 1876 election. The Compromise of 1877 gave Republican candidate Rutherford B. Hayes the White House in exchange for removing all remaining federal troops in the South. The federal government withdrew its troops from the South, and Southern Democrats took control of every Southern state. In 1882, the United States passed its first major exclusionary immigration acts, the Chinese Exclusion Act (which barred all Chinese immigrants except for students and businessmen), and the Immigration Act of 1882 (which barred all immigrants with mental health issues).

From 1890 to 1908, southern states effectively disfranchised most black voters and many poor whites by making voter registration more difficult through poll taxes, literacy tests, and other arbitrary devices. They passed segregation laws and imposed second-class status on blacks in a system known as Jim Crow that lasted until the Civil rights movement.

Growth and industrialization

Frontier and the railroad 

The latter half of the nineteenth century was marked by the rapid development and settlement of the far West, first by wagon trains and riverboats and then aided by the completion of the transcontinental railroad. Large numbers of European immigrants (especially from Germany and Scandinavia) took up low-cost or free farms in the Prairie States. Mining for silver and copper opened up the Mountain West.

Indian wars 

The United States Army fought frequent small-scale wars with Native Americans as settlers encroached on their traditional lands. Gradually the U.S. purchased the Native American tribal lands and extinguished their claims, forcing most tribes onto subsidized reservations. According to the U.S. Bureau of the Census (1894), from 1789 to 1894:

Gilded Age 

The "Gilded Age" was a term that Mark Twain used to describe the period of the late 19th century with a dramatic expansion of American wealth and prosperity, underscored by the mass corruption in the government. Reforms of the Age included the Civil Service Act, which mandated a competitive examination for applicants for government jobs. Other important legislation included the Interstate Commerce Act, which ended railroads' discrimination against small shippers, and the Sherman Antitrust Act, which outlawed monopolies in business. Twain believed that this age was corrupted by such elements as land speculators, scandalous politics, and unethical business practices.

Since the days of Charles A. Beard and Matthew Josephson, some historians have argued that the United States was effectively plutocratic for at least part of the Gilded Age and Progressive Era. As financiers and industrialists such as J.P. Morgan and John D. Rockefeller began to amass vast fortunes, many U.S. observers were concerned that the nation was losing its pioneering egalitarian spirit.

By 1890 American industrial production and per capita income exceeded those of all other countries. In response to heavy debts and decreasing farm prices, wheat and cotton farmers joined the Populist Party. An unprecedented wave of immigration from Europe served to both provide the labor for American industry and create diverse communities in previously undeveloped areas. From 1880 to 1914, peak years of immigration, more than 22 million people migrated to the United States.

Most were unskilled workers who quickly found jobs in mines, mills, and factories. Many immigrants were craftsmen (especially from Britain and Germany) bringing human skills, and others were farmers (especially from Germany and Scandinavia) who purchased inexpensive land on the Prairies from railroads who sent agents to Europe. Poverty, growing inequality and dangerous working conditions, along with socialist and anarchist ideas diffusing from European immigrants, led to the rise of the labor movement, which often included violent strikes.

Unions and strikes 

Skilled workers banded together to control their crafts and raise wages by forming labor unions in industrial areas of the Northeast. Before the 1930s few factory workers joined the unions in the labor movement. Samuel Gompers led the American Federation of Labor (1886–1924), coordinating multiple unions. Industrial growth was rapid, led by John D. Rockefeller in oil and Andrew Carnegie in steel; both became leaders of philanthropy (Gospel of Wealth), giving away their fortunes to create the modern system of hospitals, universities, libraries, and foundations.

The Panic of 1893 broke out and was a severe nationwide depression impacting farmers, workers, and businessmen who saw prices, wages, and profits fall. Many railroads went bankrupt. The resultant political reaction fell on the Democratic Party, whose leader President Grover Cleveland shouldered much of the blame. Labor unrest involved numerous strikes, most notably the violent Pullman Strike of 1894, which was shut down by federal troops under Cleveland's orders. The Populist Party gained strength among cotton and wheat farmers, as well as coal miners, but was overtaken by the even more popular Free silver movement, which demanded using silver to enlarge the money supply, leading to inflation that the silverites promised would end the depression.

The financial, railroad, and business communities fought back hard, arguing that only the gold standard would save the economy. In the most intense election in U.S. history, conservative Republican William McKinley defeated silverite William Jennings Bryan, who ran on the Democratic, Populist, and Silver Republican tickets. Bryan swept the South and West, but McKinley ran up landslides among the middle class, industrial workers, cities, and among upscale farmers in the Midwest.

Prosperity returned under McKinley, the gold standard was enacted, and the tariff was raised. By 1900 the U.S. had the strongest economy on the globe. Apart from two short recessions (in 1907 and 1920) the overall economy remained prosperous and growing until 1929. Republicans, citing McKinley's policies, took the credit.

Imperialism 

The United States emerged as a world economic and military power after 1890. The main episode was the Spanish–American War, which began when Spain refused American demands to reform its oppressive policies in Cuba. The "splendid little war", as one official called it, involved a series of quick American victories on land and at sea. At the Treaty of Paris peace conference the United States acquired the Philippines, Puerto Rico, and Guam.

Cuba became an independent country, under close American tutelage. Although the war itself was widely popular, the peace terms proved controversial. William Jennings Bryan led his Democratic Party in opposition to control of the Philippines, which he denounced as imperialism unbecoming to American democracy. President William McKinley defended the acquisition and was riding high as society had returned to prosperity and felt triumphant in the war. McKinley easily defeated Bryan in a rematch in the 1900 presidential election.

After defeating an insurrection by Filipino nationalists, the United States achieved little in the Philippines except in education, and it did something in the way of public health. It also built roads, bridges, and wells, but infrastructural development lost much of its early vigor with the failure of the railroads. By 1908, however, Americans lost interest in an empire and turned their international attention to the Caribbean, especially the building of the Panama Canal. The canal opened in 1914 and increased trade with Japan and the rest of the Far East. A key innovation was the Open Door Policy, whereby the imperial powers were given equal access to Chinese business, with not one of them allowed to take control of China.

Discontent and reform

Progressive era 

Dissatisfaction on the part of the growing middle class with the corruption and inefficiency of politics as usual, and the failure to deal with increasingly important urban and industrial problems, led to the dynamic Progressive Movement starting in the 1890s. In every major city and state, and at the federal level as well, and in education, medicine, and industry, the progressives called for the modernization and reform of decrepit institutions, the elimination of corruption in politics, and the introduction of efficiency as a criterion for change.

Leading politicians from both parties, most notably Theodore Roosevelt, Charles Evans Hughes, and Robert La Follette on the Republican side, and William Jennings Bryan and Woodrow Wilson on the Democratic side, took up the cause of progressive reform. Women became especially involved in demands for female suffrage, prohibition, and better schools. Their most prominent leader was Jane Addams of Chicago, who created settlement houses.

"Muckraking" journalists such as Upton Sinclair, Lincoln Steffens and Jacob Riis exposed corruption in business and government along with rampant inner-city poverty. Progressives implemented antitrust laws and regulated such industries of meat-packing, drugs, and railroads. Four new constitutional amendments – the Sixteenth through Nineteenth – resulted from progressive activism, bringing the federal income tax, direct election of Senators, prohibition, and female suffrage.

The period also saw a major transformation of the banking system with the creation of the Federal Reserve System in 1913 and the arrival of cooperative banking in the US with the founding of the first credit union in 1908. The Progressive Movement lasted through the 1920s; the most active period was 1900–1918.

Women's suffrage 

The women's suffrage movement began with the June 1848 National Convention of the Liberty Party. Presidential candidate Gerrit Smith argued for and established women's suffrage as a party plank. One month later, his cousin Elizabeth Cady Stanton joined with Lucretia Mott and other women to organize the Seneca Falls Convention, featuring the Declaration of Sentiments demanding equal rights for women, and the right to vote.

Many of these activists became politically aware during the abolitionist movement. The women's rights campaign during "first-wave feminism" was led by Stanton, Lucy Stone and Susan B. Anthony, among many others. Stone and Paulina Wright Davis organized the prominent and influential National Women's Rights Convention in 1850.

The movement reorganized after the Civil War, gaining experienced campaigners, many of whom had worked for prohibition in the Women's Christian Temperance Union. By the end of the 19th century a few western states had granted women full voting rights, though women had made significant legal victories, gaining rights in areas such as property and child custody.

Around 1912 the feminist movement began to reawaken, putting an emphasis on its demands for equality and arguing that the corruption of American politics demanded purification by women. Protests became increasingly common as suffragette Alice Paul led parades through the capital and major cities. Paul split from the large National American Woman Suffrage Association (NAWSA), which favored a more moderate approach and supported the Democratic Party and Woodrow Wilson, led by Carrie Chapman Catt, and formed the more militant National Woman's Party. Suffragists were arrested during their "Silent Sentinels" pickets at the White House, the first time such a tactic was used, and were taken as political prisoners.

The old anti-suffragist argument that only men could fight in a war, and therefore only men deserve the right to vote, was refuted by the enthusiastic participation of tens of thousands of American women on the home front in World War I. Across the world, industrialized countries with similar experiences gave women the right to vote. Furthermore, most of the states in the western U.S. had already given the women the right to vote in state and federal elections, and the representatives from those states, including the first woman elected to the House of Representatives, Jeannette Rankin of Montana, demonstrated that woman suffrage was a success. The main resistance came from the south, where white leaders were worried about the threat of black women voting. Congress passed the Nineteenth Amendment in 1919, and women could vote in 1920.

NAWSA became the League of Women Voters, and the National Woman's Party began lobbying for full equality and the Equal Rights Amendment, which would pass Congress during the second wave of the women's movement in 1972. Politicians responded to the new electorate by emphasizing issues of special interest to women, especially prohibition, child health, and world peace. The main surge of women voting came in 1928, when the big-city machines realized they needed the support of women to elect Al Smith, a Catholic from New York City. Meanwhile, Protestants mobilized women to support Prohibition and vote for Republican Herbert Hoover.

War, prosperity, and depression

World War I 

As World War I raged in Europe from 1914, President Woodrow Wilson took full control of foreign policy, declaring neutrality but warning Germany that resumption of unrestricted submarine warfare against American ships supplying goods to Allied nations would mean war. Germany decided to take the risk and try to win by cutting off supplies to Britain through the sinking of ships such as the RMS Lusitania. The U.S. declared war in April 1917 mainly from the threat of the Zimmermann Telegram.

American money, food, and munitions arrived in Europe quickly, but troops had to be drafted and trained. By the summer of 1918 American Expeditionary Forces soldiers under General John J. Pershing's American Expeditionary Forces arrived at the rate of 10,000 a day, while Germany was unable to replace its losses. Dissent against the war was suppressed by the Sedition Act of 1918 & Espionage Act of 1917. German language, leftist & pacifist publications were suppressed, and over 2,000 were imprisoned for speaking out against the war. The political prisoners were later released by U.S. President Warren G. Harding.

The result was Allied victory in November 1918. President Wilson demanded Germany depose the Kaiser and accept his terms in the famed Fourteen Points speech. Wilson dominated the 1919 Paris Peace Conference but Germany was treated harshly by the Allies in the Treaty of Versailles (1919) as Wilson put all his hopes in the new League of Nations. Wilson refused to compromise with Senate Republicans over the issue of Congressional power to declare war, and the Senate rejected the Treaty and the League.

Roaring twenties 

In the 1920s the U.S. grew steadily in stature as an economic and military world power. The United States Senate did not ratify the Treaty of Versailles imposed by its Allies on the defeated Central Powers; instead, the United States chose to pursue unilateralism. The aftershock of Russia's October Revolution resulted in real fears of Communism in the United States, leading to a Red Scare and the deportation of aliens considered subversive.

While public health facilities grew rapidly in the Progressive Era, and hospitals and medical schools were modernized, the country in 1918 and 1919 lost approximately 675,000 lives to the Spanish flu pandemic.

In 1920, the manufacture, sale, import and export of alcohol were prohibited by the Eighteenth Amendment, Prohibition. The result was that in cities illegal alcohol became a big business, largely controlled by racketeers.

The second Ku Klux Klan grew rapidly in 1922–1925, then collapsed. Immigration laws were passed to strictly limit the number of new entries. The 1920s were called the Roaring Twenties due to the great economic prosperity during this period. Jazz became popular among the younger generation, and thus the decade was also called the Jazz Age.

The Great Depression (1929–1939) and the New Deal (1933–1936) were decisive moments in American political, economic, and social history that reshaped the nation.

Great Depression and the New Deal 

During the 1920s, the nation enjoyed widespread prosperity, albeit with a weakness in agriculture. A financial bubble was fueled by an inflated stock market, which later led to the Stock Market Crash on October 29, 1929. This, along with many other economic factors, triggered a worldwide depression known as the Great Depression. During this time, the United States experienced deflation as prices fell, unemployment soared from 3% in 1929 to 25% in 1933, farm prices fell by half, and manufacturing output plunged by one-third.

In 1932, Democratic presidential nominee Franklin D. Roosevelt promised "a New Deal for the American people", coining the enduring label for his domestic policies. The result was a series of permanent reform programs including Relief for the unemployed, assistance for the elderly, jobs for young men, social security, unemployment insurance, public housing, bankruptcy insurance, farm subsidies, and regulation of financial securities.

State governments added new programs as well and introduced the sales tax to pay for them. Ideologically the revolution established modern liberalism in the United States and kept the Democrats in power in Washington almost continuously for three decades thanks to the New Deal coalition of ethnic whites, blacks, blue-collar workers, labor unions, and white Southerners. It provided relief to the long-term unemployed through numerous programs, such as the Works Progress Administration (WPA) and for young men, the Civilian Conservation Corps. Large scale spending projects designed to provide private sector construction jobs and rebuild the infrastructure were under the purview of the Public Works Administration.

The Second New Deal was a turn to the left in 1935–1936, building up labor unions through the Wagner Act. Unions became a powerful element of the merging New Deal coalition, which won reelection for Roosevelt in 1936, 1940, and 1944 by mobilizing union members, blue-collar workers, relief recipients, big city machines, ethnic, and religious groups (especially Catholics and Jews) and the white South, along with blacks in the North (where they could vote). Roosevelt seriously weakened his second term by a failed effort to pack the Supreme Court, which had been a center of conservative resistance to his programs.

Most of the relief programs were dropped after 1938 in the 1940s when the conservatives regained power in Congress through the Conservative coalition. Of special importance is the Social Security program, begun in 1935. The economy basically recovered by 1936, but had a sharp, short recession in 1937–1938; long-term unemployment, however, remained a problem until it was solved by wartime spending.

In an effort to denounce past U.S. interventionism and subdue any subsequent fears of Latin Americans, Roosevelt announced on March 4, 1933, during his inaugural address, "In the field of World policy, I would dedicate this nation to the policy of the good neighbor, the neighbor who resolutely respects himself and, because he does so, respects the rights of others, the neighbor who respects his obligations and respects the sanctity of his agreements in and with a World of neighbors."

To create a friendly relationship between the United States and Central as well as South American countries, Roosevelt sought to stray from asserting military force in the region. This position was affirmed by Cordell Hull, Roosevelt's Secretary of State at a conference of American states in Montevideo in December 1933. For Hispanics in the United States, however, the Great Depression was a difficult period, as the Mexican Repatriation resulted in the dislocation of an estimated 400,000 Mexicans and Mexican Americans.

World War II 

In the Depression years, the United States remained focused on domestic concerns while democracy declined across the world and many countries fell under the control of dictators. Imperial Japan asserted dominance in East Asia and in the Pacific. Nazi Germany and Fascist Italy militarized and threatened conquests, while Britain and France attempted appeasement to avert another war in Europe. U.S. legislation in the Neutrality Acts sought to avoid foreign conflicts; however, policy clashed with increasing anti-Nazi feelings following the German invasion of Poland in September 1939 that started World War II.

At first, Roosevelt positioned the U.S. as the "Arsenal of Democracy," pledging full-scale financial and munitions support for the Allies and Lend-Lease agreements – but no military personnel. Japan tried to neutralize America's power in the Pacific by attacking Pearl Harbor in 1941, but instead it catalyzed American support to enter the war.

The main contributions of the U.S. to the Allied war effort comprised money, industrial output, food, petroleum, technological innovation, and (especially 1944–1945), military personnel. Much of the focus the U.S. government was in maximizing the national economic output, causing a dramatic increase in GDP, the export of vast quantities of supplies to the Allies and to American forces overseas, the end of unemployment, and a rise in civilian consumption even as 40% of the GDP went to the war effort.

Tens of millions of workers moved from low-productivity occupations to high-efficiency jobs, improving productivity through better technology and management. Students, retired people, housewives, and the unemployed moved into the active labor force. Economic mobilization was managed by the War Production Board and a wartime production boom led to full employment, wiping out this vestige of the Great Depression. Labor shortages encouraged industry to look for new sources of workers, finding new roles for women and Blacks.

Most durable goods became unavailable, and meat, clothing, and gasoline were tightly rationed. In industrial areas housing was in short supply as people doubled up and lived in cramped quarters. Prices and wages were controlled, and Americans saved a high portion of their incomes, which led to renewed growth after the war instead of a return to depression. Americans on the home front tolerated the extra work because of patriotism, increased pay, and the confidence that it was only "for the duration," and life would return to normal as soon as the war was won.

The Allies – the United States, Britain, and the Soviet Union and other countries – saw Germany as the main threat and gave the highest priority to Europe. The U.S. dominated the war against Japan and stopped Japanese expansion in the Pacific in 1942. After the attack at Pearl Harbor and the loss of the Philippines to Japanese conquests, as well as a draw in the Battle of the Coral Sea (May 1942), the American Navy then inflicted a decisive blow at Midway (June 1942). American ground forces assisted in the North African campaign that eventually concluded with the collapse of Mussolini's fascist government in 1943, as Italy switched to the Allied side. A more significant European front was opened on D-Day, June 6, 1944, in which American and Allied forces invaded Nazi-occupied France from Britain.

War fervor also inspired anti-Japanese sentiment, leading to internment of Japanese Americans. Roosevelt's Executive Order 9066 resulted in over 120,000 Americans of Japanese descent being removed from their homes and placed in internment camps. Two-thirds of those interned were American citizens and half of them were children.

Military research and development also increase, leading to the Manhattan Project, a secret effort to harness nuclear fission to produce atomic bombs. The first nuclear device ever detonated was conducted July 16, 1945.

The Allies pushed the Germans out of France but the western front stopped short, leaving Berlin to the Soviets as the Nazi regime formally capitulated in May 1945, ending the war in Europe. In the Pacific, the U.S. implemented an island hopping strategy toward Tokyo. The Philippines was eventually reconquered, after Japan and the United States fought in history's largest naval battle, "The Battle of Leyte Gulf". However, the war wiped out all the development the United States invested in the Philippines as cities and towns were completely destroyed. After the devastation of the war, the United States granted its colony, the Philippines, independence.

The United States then established airfields for bombing runs against mainland Japan from the Mariana Islands, achieving hard-fought victories at Iwo Jima and Okinawa in 1945. Bloodied at Okinawa, the U.S. prepared to invade Japan's home islands when B-29s dropped atomic bombs on the Japanese cities of Hiroshima and Nagasaki, compelling Japan to surrender and ending World War II. The U.S. occupied Japan (and part of Germany), and restructured Japan along American lines.

During the war, Roosevelt coined the term "Four Powers" to refer four major Allies of World War II, the United States, the United Kingdom, the Soviet Union, and China, which later became the foundation of the United Nations Security Council. Though more than 400,000 military personnel and civilians were lost, the U.S. mostly prospered untouched by the physical devastation of war that inflicted a heavy toll on Europe and East Asia.

Participation in postwar foreign affairs marked the end of predominant American isolationism. The threat of nuclear weapons inspired both optimism and fear. Nuclear weapons have not been used since the war ended, and a "long peace" began between the global powers in era of competition that came to be known as the Cold War. The Truman Doctrine characterized this reality on May 22, 1947. Despite the absence of a global war during this period, there were, however, regional wars in Korea and Vietnam.

Cold War, counterculture, and civil rights

Cold War 

Following World War II, the United States emerged as one of the two dominant superpowers, the Soviet Union being the other. The U.S. Senate on a bipartisan vote approved U.S. participation in the United Nations (UN), which marked a turn away from the traditional isolationism of the U.S. and toward increased international involvement.

The primary American goal of 1945–1948 was to rescue Europe from the devastation of World War II and to contain the expansion of Communism, represented by the Soviet Union. U.S. foreign policy during the Cold War was built around the support of Western Europe and Japan along with the policy of containment, stopping the spread of communism. The U.S. joined the wars in Korea and Vietnam and toppled left-wing governments in the third world to try to stop its spread.

The Truman Doctrine of 1947 provided military and economic aid to Greece and Turkey to counteract the threat of Communist expansion in the Balkans. In 1948, the United States replaced piecemeal financial aid programs with a comprehensive Marshall Plan, which pumped money into the economy of Western Europe, and removed trade barriers, while modernizing the managerial practices of businesses and governments.

The Plan's $13 billion budget was in the context of a U.S. GDP of $258 billion in 1948 and was in addition to the $12 billion in American aid given to Europe between the end of the war and the start of the Marshall Plan. Soviet head of state Joseph Stalin prevented his satellite states from participating, and from that point on, Eastern Europe, with inefficient centralized economies, fell further and further behind Western Europe in terms of economic development and prosperity. In 1949, the United States, rejecting the long-standing policy of no military alliances in peacetime, formed the North Atlantic Treaty Organization (NATO) alliance, which continues into the 21st century. In response the Soviets formed the Warsaw Pact of communist states, leading to the "Iron Curtain".

In August 1949 the Soviets tested their first nuclear weapon, thereby escalating the risk of warfare. The threat of mutually assured destruction however, prevented both powers from nuclear war, and resulted in proxy wars, especially in Korea and Vietnam, in which the two sides did not directly confront each other.

President Dwight D. Eisenhower, elected in a landslide as the first Republican president since 1932, had a lasting impact on American life and politics. He ended the Korean War, and avoided any other major conflict. He cut military spending by reliance on very high technology, such as nuclear weapons carried by long-range bombers and intercontinental missiles. He gave strong support to the NATO alliance and built other alliances along similar lines, but they never were especially effective.

After Stalin died in 1953, Eisenhower worked to obtain friendlier relationships with the Soviet Union. At home, he ended McCarthyism, expanded the Social Security program and presided over a decade of bipartisan comity. He promoted civil rights cautiously, and sent in the Army when trouble threatened over racial integration in Little Rock, Arkansas.

The unexpected leapfrogging of American technology by the Soviets in 1957 with Sputnik, the first Earth satellite, began the Space Race, won in 1969 by the Americans as Apollo 11 landed astronauts on the Moon. The angst about the weaknesses of American education led to large-scale federal support for science education and research. In the decades after World War II, the United States became a global influence in economic, political, military, cultural, and technological affairs.

In 1960, John F. Kennedy was elected President and his administration saw the acceleration of the country's role in the Space Race, escalation of the American role in the Vietnam War, the Bay of Pigs Invasion, the Cuban Missile Crisis, and the jailing of Martin Luther King Jr. during the Birmingham campaign. President Kennedy was assassinated on November 22, 1963, leaving the nation in profound shock.

Great Society 

President Lyndon B. Johnson secured congressional passage of his Great Society programs in the mid-1960s. They included civil rights, the end of legal segregation, Medicare, extension of welfare, federal aid to education at all levels, subsidies for the arts and humanities, environmental activism, and a series of programs designed to wipe out poverty. As later historians explained:

Johnson was rewarded with an electoral landslide in 1964 against conservative Barry Goldwater, which broke the decades-long control of Congress by the Conservative coalition. However, the Republicans bounced back in 1966 and elected Richard Nixon in 1968. Nixon largely continued the New Deal and Great Society programs he inherited; conservative reaction would come with the election of Ronald Reagan in 1980. Meanwhile, the American people completed a great migration from farms into the cities and experienced a period of sustained economic expansion.

Civil rights movement 

Starting in the late 1950s, institutionalized racism across the United States, but especially in the South, was increasingly challenged by the growing Civil Rights Movement. The activism of African-American leaders Rosa Parks and Martin Luther King Jr. led to the Montgomery bus boycott, which launched the movement. For years African Americans would struggle with violence against them but would achieve great steps toward equality with Supreme Court decisions, including Brown v. Board of Education and Loving v. Virginia, the Civil Rights Act of 1964, the Voting Rights Act of 1965, and the Fair Housing Act of 1968, which ended the Jim Crow laws that legalized racial segregation between whites and blacks.

Martin Luther King Jr., who had won the 1964 Nobel Peace Prize for his efforts to achieve equality of the races, was assassinated in 1968. Following his death others led the movement, most notably King's widow, Coretta Scott King, who was also active, like her husband, in the Opposition to the Vietnam War, and in the Women's Liberation Movement. There were 164 riots in 128 American cities in the first nine months of 1967. Frustrations with the seemingly slow progress of the integration movement led to the emergence of more radical discourses during the early 1960s, which, in turn, gave rise to the Black Power movement of the late 1960s and early 1970s.

The decade would ultimately bring about positive strides toward integration, especially in government service, sports, and entertainment. Native Americans turned to the federal courts to fight for their land rights. They held protests highlighting the federal government's failure to honor treaties. One of the most outspoken Native American groups was the American Indian Movement (AIM). In the 1960s, Cesar Chavez began organizing poorly paid Mexican-American farm workers in California. He led a five-year-long strike by grape pickers. Then Chávez formed the country's first successful union of farm workers. His United Farm Workers of America (UFW) faltered after a few years but after Chavez died in 1993 he became an iconic "folk saint" in the pantheon of Mexican Americans.

Women's liberation 

A new consciousness of the inequality of American women began sweeping the nation, starting with the 1963 publication of Betty Friedan's best-seller, The Feminine Mystique, which explained how many housewives felt trapped and unfulfilled, assaulted American culture for its creation of the notion that women could only find fulfillment through their roles as wives, mothers, and keepers of the home, and argued that women were just as able as men to do every type of job. In 1966 Friedan and others established the National Organization for Women (NOW) to act for women as the NAACP did for African Americans.

 
Protests began, and the new women's liberation movement grew in size and power, gained much media attention, and, by 1968, had replaced the Civil Rights Movement as the U.S's main social revolution. Marches, parades, rallies, boycotts, and pickets brought out thousands, sometimes millions. There were striking gains for women in medicine, law, and business, while only a few were elected to office.

The women's movement was split into factions by political ideology early on, with NOW on the left, the Women's Equity Action League (WEAL) on the right, the National Women's Political Caucus (NWPC) in the center, and more radical groups formed by younger women on the far-left. The proposed Equal Rights Amendment to the Constitution, passed by Congress in 1972 was defeated by a conservative coalition mobilized by Phyllis Schlafly. They argued that it degraded the position of the housewife and made young women susceptible to the military draft.

However, many federal laws (i.e. those equalizing pay, employment, education, employment opportunities, and credit; ending pregnancy discrimination; and requiring NASA, the Military Academies, and other organizations to admit women), state laws (i.e., those ending spousal abuse and marital rape), Supreme Court rulings (i.e. ruling that the equal protection clause of the Fourteenth Amendment applied to women), and state ERAs established women's equal status under the law, and social custom and consciousness began to change, accepting women's equality. The controversial issue of abortion, deemed by the Supreme Court as a fundamental right in Roe v. Wade (1973), is still a point of debate today.

Counterculture and Cold War détente 

 

Amid the Cold War, the United States entered the Vietnam War, whose growing unpopularity fed already existing social movements, including those among women, minorities, and young people. President Lyndon B. Johnson's Great Society social programs and numerous rulings by the Warren Court added to the wide range of social reform during the 1960s and 1970s. Feminism and the environmental movement became political forces, and progress continued toward civil rights for all Americans. The Counterculture Revolution swept through the nation and much of the western world in the late sixties and early seventies, further dividing Americans in a "culture war" but also bringing forth more liberated social views.

Johnson was succeeded in 1969 by Republican Richard Nixon, who attempted to gradually turn the war over to the South Vietnamese forces. He negotiated the peace treaty in 1973 which secured the release of POWs and led to the withdrawal of U.S. troops. The war had cost the lives of 58,000 American troops. Nixon manipulated the fierce distrust between the Soviet Union and China to the advantage of the United States, achieving détente with both parties.

The Watergate scandal, involving Nixon's cover-up of his operatives' break-in into the Democratic National Committee headquarters at the Watergate office complex destroyed his political base, sent many aides to prison, and forced Nixon's resignation on August 9, 1974. He was succeeded by Vice President Gerald Ford. The Fall of Saigon, on April 30, 1975, ended the Vietnam War and resulted in North and South Vietnam being reunited. Communist victories in neighboring Cambodia and Laos occurred in the same year, with the fall of Cambodia's capital, Phnom Penh on April 17 and the taking of Laos's capital, Vientiane on December 2. 

The OPEC oil embargo marked a long-term economic transition since, for the first time, energy prices skyrocketed, and American factories faced serious competition from foreign automobiles, clothing, electronics, and consumer goods. By the late 1970s, the economy suffered an energy crisis, slow economic growth, high unemployment, and very high inflation coupled with high-interest rates (the term stagflation was coined). Since economists agreed on the wisdom of deregulation, many of the New Deal era regulations were ended, such as in transportation, banking, and telecommunications.

Jimmy Carter, running as someone who was not a part of the Washington political establishment, was elected president in 1976. On the world stage, Carter brokered the Camp David Accords between Israel and Egypt. In 1979, Iranian students stormed the U.S. embassy in Tehran and took 66 Americans hostage, resulting in the Iran hostage crisis. With the hostage crisis and continuing stagflation, Carter lost the 1980 election to the Republican Ronald Reagan. On January 20, 1981, minutes after Carter's term in office ended, the remaining U.S. captives held at the U.S. embassy in Iran were released, ending the 444-day hostage crisis.

Rise of conservatism and the end of the Cold War 

Ronald Reagan produced a major political realignment with his 1980 and 1984 landslide elections. Reagan's economic policies (dubbed "Reaganomics") and the implementation of the Economic Recovery Tax Act of 1981 lowered the top marginal tax rate from 70% to 28% over the course of seven years. Reagan continued to downsize government taxation and regulation. The U.S. experienced a recession in 1982, but the negative indicators reversed, with the inflation rate decreasing from 11% to 2%, the unemployment rate decreasing from 10.8% in December 1982 to 7.5% in November 1984, and the economic growth rate increasing from 4.5% to 7.2%.

Reagan ordered a buildup of the U.S. military, incurring additional budget deficits. Reagan introduced a complicated missile defense system known as the Strategic Defense Initiative (SDI) (dubbed "Star Wars" by opponents) in which, theoretically, the U.S. could shoot down missiles with laser systems in space. The Soviets reacted harshly because they thought it violated the 1972 Anti-Ballistic Missile Treaty and would upset the balance of power by giving the U.S. a major military advantage. For years Soviet general secretary Mikhail Gorbachev argued vehemently against SDI. However, by the late 1980s he decided the system would never work and should not be used to block disarmament deals with the U.S.

Historians argue how great an impact the SDI threat had on the Soviets – whether it was enough to force Gorbachev to initiate radical reforms, or whether the deterioration of the Soviet economy alone forced the reforms. There is agreement that the Soviets realized they were well behind the Americans in military technology, that to try to catch up would be very expensive, and that the military expenses were already a very heavy burden slowing down their economy.

The 1983 Invasion of Grenada and 1986 bombing of Libya were popular in the U.S., though his backing of the Contras rebels was mired in the controversy over the Iran–Contra affair.

Reagan met four times with Soviet leader Mikhail Gorbachev, who ascended to power as General Secretary of the Communist Party in 1985, and their summit conferences led to the signing of the Intermediate-Range Nuclear Forces Treaty. Gorbachev tried to save Communism in the Soviet Union first by ending the expensive nuclear arms race with America, then by shedding the East European empire in 1989. The Soviet Union collapsed on Christmas Day 1991, ending the U.S–Soviet Cold War.

For the remainder of the 20th century, the United States emerged as the world's sole remaining superpower and continued to intervene in international affairs during the 1990s, including the 1991 Gulf War against Iraq. Following his election in 1992, President Bill Clinton oversaw one of the longest periods of economic expansion and unprecedented gains in securities values. President Clinton worked with the Republican Congress to pass the first balanced federal budget in 30 years.Much of the economic boom was a side effect of the Digital Revolution and new business opportunities created by the internet privatized in 1993. Prior to this time ARPNET a Department of Defense Project had developed the internet for governmental, and research purposes.

In 1998, Clinton was impeached by the House of Representatives on charges of lying under oath about (perjury regarding) a sexual relationship with White House intern Monica Lewinsky. He was acquitted by the Senate. The failure of impeachment and the Democratic gains in the 1998 election forced House Speaker Newt Gingrich, a Republican, to resign from Congress.

The Republican Party expanded its base throughout the South after 1968 (except 1976), largely due to its strength among socially conservative white Evangelical Protestants and traditionalist Roman Catholics, added to its traditional strength in the business community and suburbs. As white Democrats in the South lost dominance of the Democratic Party in the 1990s, the region took on the two-party apparatus which characterized most states. The Republican Party's central leader by 1980 was Ronald Reagan, whose conservative policies called for reduced government spending and regulation, lower taxes, and a strong anti-Soviet foreign policy.

His iconic status in the party persists into the 21st century, as practically all Republican Party leaders acknowledge his stature. Social scientists Theodore Caplow et al. argue, "The Republican party, nationally, moved from right-center toward the center in the 1940s and 1950s, then moved right again in the 1970s and 1980s." They add: "The Democratic party, nationally, moved from left-center toward the center in the 1940s and 1950s, then moved further toward the right-center in the 1970s and 1980s."

The close presidential election in 2000 between Governor George W. Bush and Al Gore helped lay the seeds for political polarization to come. The vote in the decisive states of New Mexico and Florida was extremely close and produced a dramatic dispute over the counting of votes. Including 2000, the Democrats outpolled the Republicans in the national vote in every election from 1992 to 2020, except for 2004.

21st century

9/11 and the war on terror 

On September 11, 2001 ("9/11"), the United States was struck by a terrorist attack when 19 al-Qaeda hijackers commandeered four airliners to be used in suicide attacks and intentionally crashed two into both twin towers of the World Trade Center and the third into the Pentagon, killing 2,937 victims—206 aboard the three airliners, 2,606 who were in the World Trade Center and on the ground, and 125 who were in the Pentagon. The fourth plane was re-taken by the passengers and crew of the aircraft. While they were not able to land the plane safely, they were able to re-take control of the aircraft and crash it into an empty field in Pennsylvania, killing all 44 people including the four terrorists on board, thereby saving whatever target the terrorists were aiming for. Within two hours, both Twin Towers of the World Trade Center completely collapsed causing massive damage to the surrounding area and blanketing Lower Manhattan in toxic dust clouds. All in all, a total of 2,977 victims perished in the attacks. In response, President George W. Bush on September 20 announced a "war on terror". On October 7, 2001, the United States and NATO then invaded Afghanistan to oust the Taliban regime, which had provided safe haven to al-Qaeda and its leader Osama bin Laden.

The federal government established new domestic efforts to prevent future attacks. The USA PATRIOT Act increased the government's power to monitor communications and removed legal restrictions on information sharing between federal law enforcement and intelligence services. The U.S. Department of Homeland Security was created to lead and coordinate federal counter-terrorism activities. Since 2002, the U.S. government's indefinite detention of terrorism suspects captured abroad at the Guantanamo Bay detention camp, a prison at the U.S. naval base in Guantanamo Bay, Cuba, led to allegations of human rights abuses and violations of international law.

In 2003, from March 19 to May 1, the United States launched an invasion of Iraq, which led to the collapse of the Iraq government and the eventual capture of Iraqi dictator Saddam Hussein, with whom the U.S. had long-standing tense relations. The reasons for the invasion cited by the Bush administration included the spreading of democracy, the elimination of weapons of mass destruction (a key demand of the UN as well, though later investigations found parts of the intelligence reports to be inaccurate), and the liberation of the Iraqi people. Despite some initial successes early in the invasion, the continued Iraq War fueled international protests and gradually saw domestic support decline as many people began to question whether or not the invasion was worth the cost. In 2007, after years of violence by the Iraqi insurgency, President Bush deployed more troops in a strategy dubbed "the surge". While the death toll decreased, the political stability of Iraq remained in doubt.

In 2008, the unpopularity of President Bush and the Iraq war, along with the 2008 financial crisis, led to the election of Barack Obama, the first multiracial president, with African-American or Kenyan ancestry. After his election, Obama reluctantly continued the war effort in Iraq until August 31, 2010, when he declared that combat operations had ended. However, 50,000 American soldiers and military personnel were kept in Iraq to assist Iraqi forces, help protect withdrawing forces, and work on counter-terrorism until December 15, 2011, when the war was declared formally over and the last troops left the country. At the same time, Obama increased American involvement in Afghanistan, starting a surge strategy using an additional 30,000 troops, while proposing to begin withdrawing troops sometime in December 2014. In 2009, on his second day in office, Obama issued an executive order banning the use of torture, a prohibition codified into law in 2016. Obama also ordered the closure of secret CIA-run prisons overseas ("black sites"). Obama sought to close the Guantanamo Bay detention camp "as soon as practicable" and over his tenure the population of the detention camp declined from 242 inmates to 45 inmates; the Guantanamo Review Task Force cleared many prisoners for release and resettlement abroad. Obama's efforts to close the prison entirely were stymied by Congress, which in 2011 enacted a measure blocking Obama from transferring any Guantanamo detainees to U.S. facilities.

In May 2011, after nearly a decade in hiding, the founder and leader of Al Qaeda, Osama bin Laden, was killed in Pakistan in a raid conducted by U.S. naval special forces acting under President Obama's direct orders. While Al Qaeda was near collapse in Afghanistan, affiliated organizations continued to operate in Yemen and other remote areas as the CIA used drones to hunt down and remove its leadership.

The Boston Marathon bombing was a bombing incident, followed by subsequent related shootings, that occurred when two pressure cooker bombs exploded during the Boston Marathon on April 15, 2013. The bombs exploded near the marathon's finish line, killing 3 people and injuring an estimated 264 others.

The Islamic State of Iraq and the Levant rose to prominence in September 2014. In addition to taking control of much of Western Iraq and Eastern Syria, ISIS also beheaded three journalists, two American and one British. These events lead to a major military offensive by the United States and its allies in the region.

On December 28, 2014, Obama officially ended the combat mission in Afghanistan and promised a withdrawal of all remaining U.S. troops at the end of 2016 with the exception of the embassy guards. The US military mission formally ended on August 30, 2021.

Great Recession 

In September 2008, the United States and most of Europe entered the longest post–World War II recession, often called the "Great Recession". Multiple overlapping crises were involved, especially the housing market crisis, a subprime mortgage crisis, soaring oil prices, an automotive industry crisis, rising unemployment, and the worst financial crisis since the Great Depression. The financial crisis threatened the stability of the entire economy in September 2008 when Lehman Brothers failed and other giant banks were in grave danger. Starting in October the federal government lent $245 billion to financial institutions through the Troubled Asset Relief Program which was passed by bipartisan majorities and signed by Bush.

Following his election victory by a wide electoral margin in November 2008, Bush's successor – Barack Obama – signed into law the American Recovery and Reinvestment Act of 2009, which was a $787 billion economic stimulus aimed at helping the economy recover from the deepening recession. Obama, like Bush, took steps to rescue the auto industry and prevent future economic meltdowns. These included a bailout of General Motors and Chrysler, putting ownership temporarily in the hands of the government, and the "cash for clunkers" program which temporarily boosted new car sales.

The recession officially ended in June 2009, and the economy slowly began to expand once again. Beginning in December 2007, the unemployment rate steeply rose from around 5% to a peak of 10% before falling as the economy and labor markets experienced a recovery. The economic expansion that followed the Great Recession was the longest in U.S. history; strong growth led to the unemployment rate reaching a 50-year low in 2019. Despite the strong economy, increases in the costs of housing, child care, higher education, and out-of-pocket healthcare expenses surpassed increases in wages, a phenomenon some referred to as an affordability crisis. The economic expansion came to an end in early 2020 with a sharp economic contraction largely caused by the COVID-19 pandemic, which seriously affected the United States.

Recent events in 2010s 

From 2009 to 2010, the 111th Congress passed major legislation such as the Patient Protection and Affordable Care Act, informally known as Obamacare, the Dodd–Frank Wall Street Reform and Consumer Protection Act and the Don't Ask, Don't Tell Repeal Act, which were signed into law by President Obama. Following the 2010 midterm elections, which resulted in a Republican-controlled House of Representatives and a Democratic-controlled Senate, Congress presided over a period of elevated gridlock and heated debates over whether or not to raise the debt ceiling, extend tax cuts for citizens making over $250,000 annually, and many other key issues. These ongoing debates led to President Obama signing the Budget Control Act of 2011. Following Obama's 2012 re-election, Congressional gridlock continued as Congressional Republicans' call for the repeal of the Patient Protection and Affordable Care Act along with other various demands, resulted in the first government shutdown since the Clinton administration and almost led to the first default on U.S. debt since the 19th century. As a result of growing public frustration with both parties in Congress since the beginning of the decade, Congressional approval ratings fell to record lows.

Recent events also include the rise of new political movements, such as the conservative Tea Party movement and the liberal Occupy movement. The debate over the issue of rights for the LGBT community, including same-sex marriage, began to shift in favor of same-sex couples. In 2012, President Obama became the first president to openly support same-sex marriage, and the Supreme Court provided for federal recognition of same-sex unions and then nationwide legalized gay marriage in 2015.

Political debate has continued over tax reform, immigration reform, income inequality, and U.S. foreign policy in the Middle East, particularly with regards to global terrorism, the rise of the Islamic State of Iraq and the Levant and an accompanying climate of Islamophobia.

The late 2010s were marked by widespread social upheaval and change in the United States. The #MeToo movement gained popularity, exposing alleged sexual harassment and abuse in the workplace. Multiple prominent celebrities were accused of misconduct or rape. During this period, the Black Lives Matter movement also gained support online, exacerbated by the police killings of multiple black Americans. Multiple mass shootings, including the Pulse Nightclub shooting (2016) and the Las Vegas shooting, which claimed the lives of 61 people, led to increased calls for gun control and reform. Following the Stoneman Douglas High School shooting in 2018, gun control advocates organized the March for Our Lives, where millions of students across the country walked out of school to protest gun violence. The Women's March protest against Trump's presidency in 2017 was one of the largest protests in American history.

In 2016, following a contentious election, Republican Donald Trump was elected president. The results of the election were called into question, and U.S. intelligence agencies concluded that associates of the Russian government interfered in the election "to undermine public faith in the U.S. democratic process". This, along with questions about potential collusion between the Trump campaign and Russian officials, led to investigations by the FBI and Congress.

During Trump's presidency, he espoused an "America First" ideology, placing restrictions on asylum seekers and imposing a widely controversial ban on immigration from seven Muslim-majority countries. Many of his executive orders and other actions were challenged in court. During his presidency he also engaged the United States in a trade war with China, imposing a wide range of tariffs on Chinese products. In 2018, controversy erupted over the Trump administration's "zero tolerance" policy towards illegal immigrants, which involved the separation of thousands of undocumented children from their parents. After public outcry, Trump rescinded this policy. Trump's term also saw the confirmation of three new justices to the Supreme Court, cementing a conservative majority.

In 2019, a whistleblower complaint alleged that Trump had withheld foreign aid from Ukraine under the demand that they investigate the business dealings of the son of Trump's political opponent. As a result, Trump was impeached for abuse of power and obstruction of congress, becoming the third president to have been impeached, but he was acquitted.

COVID-19 pandemic and other events in 2020s 

The worldwide COVID-19 pandemic having arrived in the United States was first confirmed in January 2020. By February 2, the Trump administration restricted travel to and from China. On March 11, the WHO declared the virus to be a pandemic. In March, many state and local governments imposed "stay at home" orders to slow the spread of the virus, with the goal of reducing patient overload in hospitals. By March 26, New York Times data showed the United States to have the highest number of known cases of any country. By March 27, the country had reported over 100,000 cases. On April 2, at President Trump's direction, the Centers for Medicare & Medicaid Services (CMS) and CDC ordered additional preventive guidelines to the long-term care facility industry. On April 11, the U.S. death toll became the highest in the world when the number of deaths reached 20,000, surpassing that of Italy. On April 19, the CMS added new regulations requiring nursing homes to inform residents, their families and representatives, of COVID-19 cases in their facilities. On April 28, the total number of confirmed cases across the country surpassed 1million. , the U.S. has suffered more official COVID-19 deaths than any other country with the death toll standing at 1 million, with the U.S. death toll surpassing the number of U.S. deaths during the Spanish flu pandemic, although the Spanish flu killed 1 in 150 Americans compared to COVID-19 killing 1 in 500 Americans. As a result of the COVID-19 pandemic, U.S. life expectancy fell by over a year in 2020 and unemployment rates rose to the worst rates since the Great Depression. In 2021, U.S. life expectancy decreased by around half a year. The May 2020 murder of George Floyd caused mass protests and riots in many major cities over police brutality, with many states calling in the National Guard.

2020 was marked by a rise in domestic terrorist threats and widespread conspiracy theories around mail-in voting and COVID-19. The QAnon conspiracy theory, a fringe far-right political movement among some ardent conservatives, gained publicity and multiple major cities were hit by rioting and brawls between far-left antifascist affiliated groups and far right groups such as the Proud Boys.

Democrat Joe Biden defeated Trump in the 2020 presidential election, the first defeat of an incumbent president since 1992. The election, with an exceptional amount of voting by mail and early voting due to the danger of contracting COVID-19 at traditional voting booths, had historically high voter turnout. Trump then repeatedly made false claims of massive voter fraud and election rigging, leading to the January 6 United States Capitol attack by supporters of Trump and right-wing militias. That storming led to Trump's impeachment, as the only U.S. president to be impeached twice. The Senate later acquitted Trump despite some members of his own Republican party voting against him. After the 2021 inauguration, Biden's running-mate, then-Senator Kamala Harris, became both the first African-American and first woman vice president of the United States.

The biggest mass vaccination campaign in U.S. history kicked off on December 14, 2020, when ICU nurse Sandra Lindsay became the first person in the U.S. to receive the Pfizer-BioNTech COVID-19 vaccine. As of August 2021, 60% of the U.S. population has received a dose of the Pfizer BioNTech, Moderna, or Johnson & Johnson COVID-19 vaccine.

Following Biden's election, the date for US troops to withdraw from Afghanistan was moved back from April to August 31, 2021. In Afghanistan, the withdrawal coincided with the 2021 Taliban offensive, culminating in the fall of Kabul. Following a massive airlift of over 120,000 people, the US military mission formally ended on August 30, 2021.

Biden signed into law the American Rescue Plan Act of 2021; a $1.9 trillion stimulus bill that temporarily established expanded unemployment insurance and sent $1,400 stimulus checks to most Americans in response to continued economic pressure from COVID-19. He signed the bipartisan Infrastructure Investment and Jobs Act; a ten-year plan brokered by Biden alongside Democrats and Republicans in Congress, to invest in American roads, bridges, public transit, ports and broadband access. He appointed Ketanji Brown Jackson to the U.S. Supreme Court—the first Black woman to serve the court. Biden proposed a significant expansion of the U.S. social safety net through the Build Back Better Act, but those efforts, along with voting rights legislation, failed in Congress. However, in August 2022, Biden signed the Inflation Reduction Act of 2022, a domestic appropriations bill that included some of the provisions of the Build Back Better Act after the entire bill failed to pass. It included significant federal investment in climate and domestic clean energy production, tax credits for solar panels, electric cars and other home energy programs as well as a three-year extension of Affordable Care Act subsidies. From June of 2022 Biden went on a string of legislative achievements; with the signing of The Bipartisan Safer Communities Act, the CHIPS and Science Act, a massive investment in the Semiconductor industry and manufacturing, Honoring our PACT Act of 2022, expansion of veterans healthcare and the Respect for Marriage Act, repealing the Defense of Marriage Act and codifying Same-sex and Interracial marriage.

On June 24, 2022, the Supreme Court, in a landmark ruling, determined that abortion is not a protected right under the Constitution. The ruling, Dobbs v. Jackson Women's Health Organization overturned Roe v. Wade and Planned Parenthood v. Casey and sparked protests outside of the Supreme Court building and across the country.

Ketanji Brown Jackson succeeded Justice Breyer upon his retirement from the court on June 30, 2022. She became the first black woman and the first former federal public defender to serve on the Supreme Court upon her swearing in.

See also

Notes

References

Sources
 
 
 
 
 
 
 
 
 
 
 
 
  in

External links

 
 
 
 
 , American history public radio show hosted by Ed Ayers, Brian Balogh, and Peter Onuf